Peter Andrew Tranchell (14 July 1922 – 14 September 1993) was a British composer.

Life and career
Tranchell was born at Cuddalore, India, on 14 July 1922, and educated at the Dragon School, Oxford, Clifton College and King's College, Cambridge. During the Second World War he served, like his father, Col. H G Tranchell, in the Indian Army, after which he resumed his Cambridge studies, changing from exhibitioner in Classics to Music.

He was Lecturer in Music at the University of Cambridge from 1950 to 1989, and Fellow and Director of Studies in music at Gonville and Caius College from 1960 to 1989. As Praecentor of the college (following the retirement of Patrick Hadley) he directed the chapel choir. He died on 14 September 1993 near his home in Curdridge near Botley in Hampshire.

Amongst other activities at Caius, Tranchell became the patron, at the request of, predominantly, members of the college choir, of a dining society at Caius named the Titus Oates Society as a sort of antidote to other college clubs. He was asked by those wishing to form another dining club for a suitable name and suggested, with his frequent cheekiness, that of the most reprehensible member of Caius thitherto: Titus Oates. The dinners – dinners on the last day of Full Term in the first two academic terms and a picnic, normally watching the Bumps on the Saturday after the last – known as "Exceedings", were marked by exemplary food and drink from the college's kitchen staff (whom he held in the highest regard) and cellars and ran to some nine or so courses. In 1983, the cost was £17. This was a deliberate policy of Tranchell's to ensure that the cost would not bar anyone. This accords with Tranchell's sense of egalitarianism recorded in his descriptions of his time in the Indian Army. The dinners included various toasts: to Titus Oates, to a saint of the day – preceded by an entertaining biography of each – and to The Queen. The Titus Oates Society ran from the early 1970s until around the early 1990s, the patronage having been passed to other Fellows of the college on Tranchell's retirement in 1989.

His compositions included the opera The Mayor of Casterbridge (1951), anthems, and a cantata.  He was also a composer of light music, his output including vocal "entertainments", instrumental miniatures and the musical comedy Zuleika (after Max Beerbohm), produced in Cambridge in 1954 and revived in 1957. His archive is kept at Cambridge University Library.

Selected works

Ballets
Falstaff (1950) 

Fate's Revenge (1951), performed by Ballet Rambert at the Lyric, Hammersmith 

Images of Love, (1964) produced at Covent Garden with choreography by Kenneth MacMillan

Operas and musicals
The Mayor of Casterbridge (1951)

Zuleika (1954)

Thackeray Ditties (1962)

His First Mayweek (1963)

Incidental music
Johnson over Jordan (J. B. Priestley; 1947)

Macbeth (William Shakespeare; 1949)

The Merchant of Venice (Shakespeare; 1950)

Instrumental works
Organ Sonata (1958)
Festive Overture (1966)

Choral works
Te Deum in E (1975)

This Sorry Scheme of Things (1953) 

The Joyous Year (1961)

If ye would hear the angels sing (1965)

Hymn tunes
MORESTEAD
Words (Kaan): "The Fullness of the Earth is God's Alone"
SWANMORE
Words (Kaan): "The Earth The Sky The Oceans"
DROXFORD
Words (Kaan): "God gave to Man to have and hold"
DURLEY
Words (Kaan): "Thank you O Lord"
These were published in Pilgrim Praise Music Edition, 1972 by Fred Kaan, published by Stainer & Bell.
WISH ROAD
"Lord, dismiss us with thy blessing" (written for Eastbourne College)

References

External links
 Official website

1922 births
1993 deaths
Alumni of King's College, Cambridge
Fellows of Gonville and Caius College, Cambridge
People educated at Clifton College
People educated at The Dragon School
People from Cambridge
English classical composers
Light music composers
English opera composers
Male opera composers
Musicians from Cambridgeshire
People from Cuddalore district
Indian military personnel of World War II
20th-century classical composers
20th-century English composers
English male classical composers
20th-century British male musicians
British people in colonial India